Galinsoga mollis is a rare Mexican species of flowering plant in the family Asteraceae. It has been found only in the State of Jalisco in western Mexico.

Description
Each head has about 8 white ray flowers surrounding as many as 150 yellow disc flowers.

References

mollis
Flora of Jalisco
Plants described in 1972